Selkridge is a surname. Notable people with the surname include:

 Barbara Selkridge (born 1971), Antiguan sprinter
 Oral Selkridge (born 1962), Antiguan sprinter